The Hebbal-Kittayya 750CE Inscription is one of the oldest known Kannada language inscriptions in Kannada script and Bangalore's oldest inscription. The inscription was discovered on 1 May 2018 in Hebbal. The inscription is on a Ooralivu Veeragallu in honour of Hebbal native Kittayya. Ooralivu veeragallu’s are memorial stones erected in honour of a person martyred defending an attack on his or her town.

Discovered by a few residents in Hebbal, this inscription was deciphered by P.V. Krishnamurthy, professor of epigraphy at the Kannada Sahitya Parishat as an inscription from the era of Ganga King Sripurusha in the 8th century CE.

The Ooralivu Veeragallu inscription is now installed in a crowd-funded Ganga-style stone mantapa adjoining the Hebbal city library, Bangalore.

Discovery and dating 

Until May 2018, lying in a roadside ditch close to Hebbal village gate were four ancient puja stones. These were in danger of being buried in any road development project. Dilip Kshatriya, a resident of Hebbal contacted Revival Heritage Hub (RHH), a Bengaluru based organization working in the area of heritage conservation and with their support, the four "puja" stones were shifted to an adjacent BBMP office. Of these four stones, one of which a veeragallu when dug revealed a hitherto unknown and undocumented inscription on the portion that was buried under the earth. This veeragallu inscription was subsequently deciphered by Dr. P.V. Krishnamurthy an eminent Kannada epigraphist and dated to 750 CE.

When discovered parts of the veeragallu had flaked and the inscription somewhat weathered. A 3D digital scan assisted in reading the inscription completely. On Palaeographic considerations, the date of the inscription is assigned to 750CE. In the absence of an explicit date mentioned in an inscription, it is a traditional practice to assign a date to the closest 10, 50, or 100th year on palaeographical considerations.

Transliteration of the text in modern English

The text of the inscription in Purvada halegannada language and written in Ganga period Kannada script was deciphered by eminent epigraphist Dr. P.V. Krishnamurthy. The exact transliteration of the inscription in IAST is as follows (line numbers are not part of the original inscription, including them is a default practice with inscriptions).

 svasti śrī siripuruṣa mahārājā prathuvī rājyaṃgeyye
 perbboḷalnāḍu mūvattumānpeḻnāgattarasarāḷe āra
 kammoṟara maiṃdunaṃ koḍandaleyara kittayanā raṭṭavā
 ḍi kūci tandoḍe ūraḻivinūḷeṟidindraka pukān
 pergundiyu kiṟugundi tamma kurḷniṟidodu i kalluṃ

Transliteration of the text in modern Kannada

The full reading of the inscription as published by Dr. P.V. Krishnamurthy in Itihaasa Darpana Vol 36-38, 2018.

 ಸ್ವಸ್ತಿ ಶ್ರೀ ಸಿರಿಪುರುಷ ಮಹಾರಾಜಾ ಪ್ರಥುವೀ ರಾಜ್ಯಂಗೆಯ್ಯೆ
 ಪೆರ್ಬ್ಬೊಳಲ್ನಾಡು ಮೂವತ್ತುಮಾನ್ಪೆೞ್ನಾಗತ್ತರಸರಾಳೆ ಆರ
 ಕಮ್ಮೊಱರ ಮೈಂದುನಂ ಕೊಡನ್ದಲೆಯರ ಕಿತ್ತಯನಾ ರಟ್ಟವಾ
 ಡಿ ಕೂಚಿ ತನ್ದೊಡೆ ಊರೞಿವಿನೂಳೆಱಿದಿನ್ದ್ರಕ ಪುಕಾನ್
 ಪೆರ್ಗುನ್ದಿಯು ಕಿಱುಗುನ್ದಿ ತಮ್ಮ ಕುರ್ಳ್ನಿಱಿದೊದು ಇ ಕಲ್ಲುಂ

Explanation of the inscription 

A literal translation of the inscription is:

Ganga King Sripurusha was a powerful king of the Ganga dynasty who ruled between 726 - 788 CE. The Western Ganga dynasty were a powerful Southern Indian dynasty from 400-1000CE. Sripurusha’s kingdom referred to as Gangavadi 96000 extended to the regions of modern-day Kolar, Bangalore, Krishnagiri, Salem, Erode, Mandya, Mysore, Coorg, Chikamagalur, Shimoga and Tumkur districts. Numerous veeragallu found from this period in these regions are testimonies to the fierce battles and skirmishes between the Gangas and the Rashtrakutas during this period.

Etymology of the place name Hebbal  

The following is the etymology for the place-name Hebbal.

 (big) +  (town) in 

ಪಿರಿಯ + ಪೊೞಲ್ = ಪೆರ‍್ಬೊೞಲ್ > ಪೆರ್ವ್ವೊೞಲ್ > ಪೆರ್ಬ್ಬೊೞಲ್ > ಪೆರ್ಬ್ಬೊಳ್ > ಪೆಬ್ಬೊಳ್ > ಪೆಬ್ಬಾಳ > ಹೆಬ್ಬಾಳ

Between the 9th & 11th centuries many words in the Kannada language beginning with the character pa (ಪ), the pa was replaced with character ha (ಹ) (e.g, puli->huli, paalu-> haalu). Similarly in some words containing a va (ವ), the va was replaced by a ba (ಬ). Over the centuries perbolal has become Hebbal today.

Importance of the inscription  

 The Hebbal-Kittayya inscription is the oldest intact Kannada inscription in the city of Bengaluru. For comparison, it predates the earliest available literary work in Kannada, Kavirajamarga by about 100 years and provides an idea of the form and shape of characters that would have been used in this famous literary work by its author.
 Being the oldest inscription in Bengaluru, Kittayya named in the inscription is the first documented resident of modern-day Bengaluru. This is the reason why he is fondly referred to as Bengaluru's first citizen by many historians.

The crowd-funded Ganga style mantapa 

Bangalore once had about 160+ inscription stones documented in the Epigraphia Carnatica Vol 9, 1905ed. However, an on the ground verification shows only some 50 of these inscription stones are still around today. The 100+ inscription stones having been lost to callous development. In view of this and considering that a 750CE era inscription stone being discovered within the city as extremely improbable, a citizens group working for the conservation and awareness Bangalore’s inscriptions “Inscription Stones of Bangalore” launched a project to build a mantapa (pavilion) befitting enough for the Hebbal-Kittayya inscription. Yashaswini Sharma a conservation architect designed on pro-bono basis a Ganga style mantapa to house the inscription and the crowdfunding effort culminated in the completion of the mantapa in January 2020. Residents of Hebbal formally inaugurated-celebrated the completion of the mantapa by integrating it into their Sankranthi (Harvest festival) celebrations on 14 January 2020.

See also
Indian inscriptions
Kannada inscriptions
Early Indian epigraphy
History of Bangalore
Western Ganga dynasty
Hindu temple architecture

References

Kannada literature
Literature of Karnataka
History of Bangalore
 Kannada inscriptions